"Blind Love" is a Japanese-language song by the South Korean rock band CNBLUE, written and produced by Lee Jong-hyun and Vinyl House. It is their fifth major single in Japan under Warner Music Japan and their eighth overall. It was released on April 24, 2013, in 3 different editions.

Background
The single was announced by the group's Korean label, FNC Media, on March 1, via their official Japanese website. On March 27, details about the single were revealed. It will be released in three different editions: two limited with a DVD and a regular CD only edition. Track list and jacket covers were also revealed.

Editions
The single was released in three editions. Every edition comes with a different instrumental, different enclosed card with a serial code and a lottery ticket for a special event.

Limited edition type A: This edition includes the CD single, a DVD with the live concert "Music for All, All for One", held at the National Yoyogi Stadium First Gymnasium on December 24, 2012, music video of "Blind Love" with a special feature from the recording of the music video, one lottery ticket for a special event and a serial code type A. This edition includes the instrumental of the song "With Your Eyes".
Limited edition type B: This edition includes the CD single, a DVD with the special release event of the single "Robot", held in TFT Hall on December 23, 2012, two lottery tickets for a special event and a serial code type B. This edition includes the instrumental of the song "Greedy Man".
Regular edition: This edition includes the CD single only and the instrumental of the song "Blind Love". First press editions of the single includes three lottery tickets for a special event and a serial code type C.

Composition
The song was written by the member Lee Jong-hyun who also composed the song with Vinyl House. Lee Jong-hyun also wrote and composed the first b-side of the single, the song "With Your Eyes". The member Jung Yong-hwa wrote the second b-side of the single, "Greedy Man", and composed the song with Kim Jae-yang.

Track listing

Charts
In its first day of release the physical single debuted at number two in Oricon's daily chart with 35,773 copies sold, the highest first day ever from CNBLUE Japanese releases.

Oricon

Other charts

Release history

References

External links
  

2013 singles
Japanese-language songs
CNBLUE songs
2013 songs
Songs written by Lee Jong-hyun
Warner Music Japan singles